Guoxing Township is a rural township in Nantou County, Taiwan. As of February 2023, the township has a population total of 17,168.

Administrative divisions

Guoxing, Shimen, Daqi, Zhangliu, Zhangfeng, Zhangfu, Beigang, Fugui, Gangou, Ganlin, Dashi, Beishan and Nangang Villages.

Tourist attractions
 Nuomi Bridge

Notable natives
 Peng Pai-hsien, Magistrate of Nantou County (2001)

Transportation
Guoxing Interchange connects Guoxing Township to National freeway 6.

Guoxing Township is served by Nantou Bus, Taichung Bus, and Chuan Hang Bus.

External links

 Guoshing Township Office 

Townships in Nantou County